Bel Ayr Park is a mostly residential neighbourhood in the Dartmouth community of Halifax Regional Municipality, Nova Scotia, Canada. It is located in the east end of Dartmouth in the Woodlawn area. The houses in this area mostly made of brick.

References

External links
map

Communities in Halifax, Nova Scotia
Dartmouth, Nova Scotia